Erzsébet Balogh (née Nyári, born March 14, 1950, in Berettyóújfalu) is a former Hungarian handball player and multiple World Championship medalist. In 1980 she was also member of the Hungarian team which finished fourth on the Olympic Games. She played in four matches and scored two goals on the tournament.

References

1950 births
Living people
People from Berettyóújfalu
Hungarian female handball players
Olympic handball players of Hungary
Handball players at the 1980 Summer Olympics
Sportspeople from Hajdú-Bihar County